V. J. James is an Indian writer who primarily writes in Malayalam language. His first book, Purapaadinte Pusthakam, was published by DC Books as the winning work in the novel competition conducted as a part of its 25th anniversary celebration in 1999. His novel Nireeshwaran, which explores the clashes between theism and atheism, won several awards including the Kerala Sahitya Akademi Award and Vayalar Award.

Life
V. J. James was born in Changanassery, Kottayam, Kerala, India. He attended St. Theresa's Higher Secondary School, Vazhappally and St. Mary's Higher Secondary School, Champakulam, before studying at St. Berchmans College, Changanacherry. He has a bachelor's degree in mechanical engineering from Mar Athanasius College of Engineering. He currently works for Vikram Sarabhai Space Centre, Thiruvananthapuram, as an engineer.

Awards
 DC Silver Jubilee Award
 Malayattoor Prize (1999), 
 Rotary Literary Award for Purappadinte Pusthakam
 Thoppil Ravi Award for Nireeshwaran
 Kerala Bhasha Institute Basheer Award (2015) for Nireeshwaran
Kerala Sahitya academy (2017) for Nireeshwaran
 Basheer Puraskaram (2018) for Nireeshwaran
Thikkurissi award (2018) for Anticlock
Vayalar Award (2019) for Nireeshwaran

Writing 
V. J. James has said that he observes everyday life closely, as it "helps him to narrate common man's life with authenticity". His novels are known for explaining serious subjects in simple language.

Published works

Novels 
 1999 - Purappadinte Pusthakam (പുറപ്പാടിന്റെ പുസ്തകം)
 2002 - Chorashasthram (ചോരശാസ്ത്രം)
 2005 - Dathapaharam (ദത്താപഹാരം)
 2006 - Leyka (ലെയ്ക)
 2013 - Ottakkaalan Kakka (ഒറ്റക്കാലൻ കാക്ക)
 2014 - Nireeshwaran (നിരീശ്വരൻ)
 2018 - Anticlock (ആന്റിക്ലോക്ക്)

Short story collections
 Shavangalil Pathinaraman (ശവങ്ങളിൽ പതിനാറാമൻ)
 Bhoomiyilekkulla thurumbicha Vathayanangal (ഭൂമിയിലേക്കുള്ള തുരുമ്പിച്ച വാതായനങ്ങൾ)
 Vyakulamathavinte Kannadikkoodu (വ്യാകുലമാതാവിന്റെ കണ്ണാടിക്കൂട്)
 Pranayopanishath (പ്രണയോപനിഷത്ത്)
VJ James kathakal 

Munthirivallikal Thalirkkumbol, a 2017 Malayalam family drama film directed by Jibu Jacob, written by Sindhu Raj, and starring Mohanlal and Meena, is loosely based on James' Malayalam short story Pranayopanishath (പ്രണയോപനിഷത്ത്).

References

External links 
 

Malayalam novelists
Year of birth missing (living people)
Living people
People from Changanassery
Novelists from Kerala
Engineers from Kerala
Indian male novelists
Indian male short story writers
20th-century Indian novelists
Indian mechanical engineers
Indian Space Research Organisation people
20th-century Indian engineers
20th-century Indian male writers